Hermann Baumann (born 1 August 1934) is a German horn player.

Biography 
After starting his musical career as a singer and jazz drummer he switched to horn at the age of 17. He studied with Fritz Huth at the Hochschule für Musik Würzburg and then played principal horn in various orchestras for 12 years, including the Dortmunder Philharmoniker and the Stuttgart Radio Symphony Orchestra.

His career as a soloist started in 1964 when he won first prize in the prestigious ARD International Music Competition in Munich. Since then he has played on many solo and chamber albums, including Virtuoso Horn, released in 2004. He has done pioneering work in Baroque music and also in the revival of performance on the natural horn of the classical period. In 1999, the Historic Brass Society honored him with the Christopher Monk Award for his lifelong contribution to music on old instruments.

Baumann taught at the Folkwang Hochschule in Essen for 30 years and at horn conventions around the world.

Publications 
Entries to Hermann Baumann in WorldCat

References 

German classical horn players
Musicians from Hamburg
1934 births
Living people
Natural horn players
Academic staff of the Folkwang University of the Arts